The 1999 Chicago Cubs season was the 128th season of the Chicago Cubs franchise, the 124th in the National League and the 84th at Wrigley Field. The Cubs finished sixth and last in the National League Central with a record of 67–95.

Offseason
December 2, 1998: Henry Rodriguez was signed as a free agent with the Chicago Cubs.
December 7, 1998: Glenallen Hill was signed as a free agent with the Chicago Cubs.

Regular season

Season standings

Record vs. opponents

Transactions
July 3, 1999: Carlos Mármol was signed by the Chicago Cubs as an amateur free agent.

Roster
{| class="toccolours" style="font-size: 95%;"
|-
! colspan="10" style="background-color: #0e3386; color: #FFFFFF; text-align: center;" | 1999 Chicago Cubs 
|-
| colspan="10" style="background-color: #EE1422; color: #FFFFFF; text-align: center;" | Roster
|-
| valign="top" | Pitchers
 
 
 
 
 
 
 
 
 
 
 
 
 
 
  
 
 
 
 
 
 
 
 
| width="25px" | 
| valign="top" | Catchers
 
 
 
 
Infielders
 
 
 
 
 
 
  
 
 
 
 
| width="25px" | 
| valign="top" | Outfielders
 
 
 
 
 
 
 
Other batters
 
| width="25px" | 
| valign="top" | Manager Coaches'  (bullpen)
  (pitching)
  (third base)
  (hitting)
  (first base)
  (bench)
|}

 Player stats 

 Batting 

 Starters by position Note: Pos = Position; G = Games played; AB = At bats; H = Hits; Avg. = Batting average; HR = Home runs; RBI = Runs batted in Other batters Note: G = Games played; AB = At bats; H = Hits; Avg. = Batting average; HR = Home runs; RBI = Runs batted in Pitching 

 Starting pitchers Note: G = Games pitched; IP = Innings pitched; W = Wins; L = Losses; ERA = Earned run average; SO = Strikeouts Other pitchers Note: G = Games pitched; IP = Innings pitched; W = Wins; L = Losses; ERA = Earned run average; SO = Strikeouts Relief pitchers Note: G = Games pitched; W = Wins; L = Losses; SV = Saves; ERA = Earned run average; SO = Strikeouts Farm system 

References

1999 Chicago Cubs season at Baseball Reference''

Chicago Cubs seasons
Chicago Cubs Season, 1999
Cub